Johnny Renando Ruffin (born July 29, 1971) is an American former professional baseball pitcher. He played six seasons in Major League Baseball (MLB) for the Cincinnati Reds, Arizona Diamondbacks and Florida Marlins. He also played one season in Nippon Professional Baseball (NPB) with the Kintetsu Buffaloes and one season in the KBO League for the SK Wyverns.

Career
Ruffin was drafted by the Chicago White Sox in the 4th round of the 1988 MLB draft. He played in MLB with the Cincinnati Reds from 1993 to 1996, then spent a season in Japan with the Kintetsu Buffaloes. (He returned to MLB with the Arizona Diamondbacks (2000) and Florida Marlins (2001).

A 2016 AL.com article named Ruffin the best athlete to come from Choctaw County, Alabama.

References

External links

Retrosheet
Pura Pelota Venezuelan Professional Baseball League statistics
Career statistics and player information from Korea Baseball Organization

1971 births
Living people
Albuquerque Dukes players
American expatriate baseball players in Canada
American expatriate baseball players in Japan
American expatriate baseball players in Mexico
American expatriate baseball players in South Korea
Arizona Diamondbacks players
Baseball players from Alabama
Birmingham Barons players
Calgary Cannons players
Caribes de Oriente players
Cincinnati Reds players
Florida Marlins players
Guerreros de Oaxaca players
Gulf Coast White Sox players
Indianapolis Indians players
KBO League pitchers
Kintetsu Buffaloes players
Louisville Bats players
Louisville Redbirds players
Louisville RiverBats players
Major League Baseball pitchers
Nashua Pride players
Nashville Sounds players
Mexican League baseball pitchers
Nippon Professional Baseball pitchers
Norfolk Tides players
Pawtucket Red Sox players
Pennsylvania Road Warriors players
People from Butler, Alabama
Sarasota White Sox players
SSG Landers players
South Bend White Sox players
Tiburones de La Guaira players
American expatriate baseball players in Venezuela
Tucson Sidewinders players
Utica Blue Sox players
African-American baseball players